Lockdown is a Bengali drama film directed by Abhimanyu Mukherjee. This film was released on 10 September 2021 under the banner of Artage and Pandemonium Productions.

Plot
The movie revolves with the life of three different types of couple and their mental trauma in lockdown during the Covid 19 pandemic situation. The plot is how they are facing personal and social crises.

Cast
 Soham Chakraborty
 Srabanti Chatterjee as Madhubala
Ananya Guha as teenage Madhubala
 Adrit Roy as Raj
 Om Prakash Sahani
 Rajnandini Pal as Pollabi Bannerjee
 Manali Manisha Dey
 Bhavna Banerjee as Jhuma

References

2021 films
Bengali-language Indian films
Indian drama films
2020s Bengali-language films
Films about the COVID-19 pandemic

External links